James J. Bergen (October 1, 1847 – October 20, 1923) was Speaker of the New Jersey General Assembly and an associate justice of the New Jersey Supreme Court.

Biography
Born in Somerville, New Jersey on October 1, 1847, he was the son of John James Bergen and Mary Ann Park.

He was a Democratic Party member of the New Jersey General Assembly from Somerset County from 1876 to 1877 and 1891 to 1892, the latter term of which he was Speaker. He was a delegate to the Democratic National Convention from New Jersey in 1896.

Bergen was Somerset County Prosecutor of the Pleas from 1877 to 1883. He was Vice-chancellor of New Jersey Court of Chancery from 1904 to 1907 and Associate Justice of New Jersey Supreme Court from 1907 to 1915.

He married May 3, 1883 to Helen Arden Huggins, with whom he had three children.

He died at his home in Somerville on October 20, 1923.

See also
List of justices of the Supreme Court of New Jersey
New Jersey Court of Errors and Appeals
Courts of New Jersey

References

1847 births
1923 deaths
Justices of the Supreme Court of New Jersey
Democratic Party members of the New Jersey General Assembly
Speakers of the New Jersey General Assembly
Politicians from Somerville, New Jersey